Neoxabea is a genus of smooth-legged tree crickets in the family Gryllidae. There are about 14 described species in Neoxabea.

Species
These 14 species belong to the genus Neoxabea:

 Neoxabea astales Walker, 1967
 Neoxabea bipunctata (De Geer, 1773) (two-spotted tree cricket) 
 Neoxabea brevipes Rehn, 1913
 Neoxabea cerrojesusensis Collins & van den Berghe, 2014
 Neoxabea enodis Walker, 1967
 Neoxabea femorata Walker, 1967
 Neoxabea formosa (Walker, 1869)
 Neoxabea lepta Walker, 1967
 Neoxabea meridionalis Bruner, 1916
 Neoxabea mexicana Collins & Velazco-Macias, 2021
 Neoxabea obscurifrons Bruner, 1916
 Neoxabea ottei Collins & van den Berghe, 2014
 Neoxabea quadrula Walker, 1967
 Neoxabea trinodosa Hebard, 1928

References

Further reading

 

Tree crickets
Articles created by Qbugbot